The 1999 du Maurier Open singles was the singles event of the one hundred and tenth edition of the Canadian Open; a WTA Tier I tournament and the most prestigious women's tennis tournament held in Canada.

Monica Seles was the four-time defending champion (an Open Era Canadian Open record), but she was defeated in the final by Martina Hingis.

Seeds
The top eight seeds received a bye to the second round.

Qualifying draw
q

Draw

Finals

Top half

Section 1

Section 2

Bottom half

Section 3

Section 4

References
 1999 du Maurier Open Draw

Singles